The Blacklist is an American crime drama series created by Jon Bokenkamp that premiered on NBC on September 23, 2013.  It stars James Spader, Megan Boone, Diego Klattenhoff, Ryan Eggold, Hisham Tawfiq, and Harry Lennix. Raymond "Red" Reddington (James Spader), one of the FBI's most wanted fugitives, surrenders at J. Edgar Hoover Building in Washington, D.C. He claims that he and the FBI have similar interests in getting rid of dangerous criminals and terrorists. Reddington will cooperate only with Elizabeth Keen (Megan Boone), a rookie FBI criminal profiler who we see in the first episode, has trouble profiling just herself and is not too keen on the idea. Over the course of his own criminal career, Reddington has made a list of global criminals who he believes are acting liabilities to his own interests or to society, most of whom are unknown to the FBI, and not on the FBI's "Most Wanted" list — he calls it "The Blacklist". As the series progresses, Reddington uses the FBI to apprehend enemies and strategic interests for his own personal gain. Executive producers for the series include Bokenkamp, John Eisendrath, and John Davis for Sony Pictures Television, Universal Television, and Davis Entertainment.

In February 2022, NBC renewed the series for a tenth and final season which premiered on February 26, 2023.

Series overview

Episodes

Season 1 (2013–14)

Season 2 (2014–15)

Season 3 (2015–16)

Season 4 (2016–17)

Season 5 (2017–18)

Season 6 (2019)

Season 7 (2019–20)

Season 8 (2020–21)

Season 9 (2021–22)

Season 10 (2023)

Special episodes

Behind The Blacklist (2021)
The first 22-minute special episode was made available exclusively on NBC show page on November 4, 2021, featuring a backstage of the show and a preview for Season 9.

Celebration episodes
Each time the show passes an episodic milestone, the cast and crew have a celebration on the set of the Task Force headquarters. Some moments of the celebration, along with remarks from the cast, is published on NBC's official website as web exclusive content.

References

External links 
 
 

Lists of American crime drama television series episodes